Kevin Arthur Hugh Campbell (born 24 December 1950) is a former South African international lawn bowler.

Bowls career

World Championships
Campbell came to prominence in 1976 when he won the triples, fours and team gold medals at the 1976 World Outdoor Bowls Championship in Johannesburg. In the Triples with Nando Gatti and Kelvin Lightfoot they won 14 of their 15 matches. In the fours with Gatti, Lightfoot and Bill Moseley they repeated the feat of winning 14 of the 15 matches played.

The South African team completed a clean sweep of all events at the 1976 World Outdoor Bowls Championship. The lawn bowlers from South Africa were denied further opportunities to win medals due to the Sporting boycott of South Africa during the apartheid era.

Sixteen years later he won the triples silver medal and fours bronze medal at the 1992 World Outdoor Bowls Championship in Worthing followed by another bronze at the 1996 World Outdoor Bowls Championship in Adelaide.

Commonwealth Games
He also won a silver at the 2002 Commonwealth Games in Manchester.

National
Campbell became the youngest ever Springbok international aged 24 and his mother and father both won South African National Bowls Championships.

References

External links
 
 

1950 births
Living people
South African male bowls players
Bowls World Champions
Commonwealth Games medallists in lawn bowls
Commonwealth Games silver medallists for South Africa
Bowls players at the 1994 Commonwealth Games
Bowls players at the 2002 Commonwealth Games
Bowls players at the 2006 Commonwealth Games
Place of birth missing (living people)
Medallists at the 2002 Commonwealth Games